At the Existentialist Café: Freedom, Being, and Apricot Cocktails is a 2016 book written by Sarah Bakewell that covers the philosophy and history of the 20th century movement existentialism. The book provides an account of the modern day existentialists who came into their own before and during the second world war. The book discusses the ideas of the phenomenologist Edmund Husserl, and how his teaching influenced the rise of existentialism through the likes of Martin Heidegger, Jean Paul Sartre, Simone De Beauvoir, who are the main protagonists of the book. The title refers to an incident in which Sartre's close friend and fellow philosopher Raymond Aron startled him when they were in a cafe, by pointing to the glass in front of him and stating, "You can make a philosophy out of this cocktail."

Summary
Bakewell structures At the Existentialist Café by focusing each chapter on a particular philosopher or period within the existentialist movement, starting by introducing the early existentialists Kierkegaard, Nietzsche, Dostoevsky and Kafka, and then moving on to the lives and philosophies of Heidegger, Husserl, Sartre, Beauvoir, Camus, Karl Jaspers, and Merleau-Ponty.

Footnotes

Bibliography

External links 
http://www.otherpress.com/books/at-the-existentialist-cafe/
https://sarahbakewell.com/books-3/at-the-existentialist-cafe-2/

2016 non-fiction books
Works about existentialism
Existentialist books
Chatto & Windus books
Other Press books
Knopf Canada books